AEK Arena – Georgios Karapatakis is a football stadium in Larnaca, Cyprus. Completed in 2016, it is the home ground of AEK Larnaca and has a total seating capacity of 8,058.

Name 
The new stadium's official name is "AEK Arena – George Karapatakis", in honor of the father of the President of AEK, Mr Andros Karapatakis.

History 
AEK Arena was built on land owned by the GSZ Stadium. AEK Larnaca and GSZ have agreed to build a stadium on this land. The stadium is owned by AEK Larnaca, and was built by its own cost. The responsibility of the construction was assigned to Balltown Holdings (Public) Ltd, which was founded for this purpose by AEK.

The construction of the stadium was planned to be done in two phases. The first phase began on 7 September 2015. Initially, only 3 of the 4 stands would be built. However, in the course of the implementation of the project, a mandate was given to build the fourth stand.

The stadium was inaugurated on Monday 17 October 2016 with the match between AEK and Aris for the 7th matchday of the 2016–17 Cypriot First Division. AEK won the match with 4–0 score. The first goal which achieved in AEK Arena was scored by Jorge Larena. The official inauguration took place on 27 November 2016.

The first match of European competition was held on 29 June 2017 for the first qualifying round of Europa League 2017–18, when ΑΕΚ faced Lincoln Red Imps F.C. AEK won the match with 5–0 score.

Funding 
The cost of building the stadium:

1) €7 million for the first phase (done)

2) €3 million for the second phase

Categorisation 
AEK Arena is classified as a UEFA Category 3 stadium. After the completion of the second phase projects, the stadium will belong in UEFA Category 4.

References

External links

 Official website

2016 establishments in Cyprus
Football venues in Cyprus
Multi-purpose stadiums in Cyprus
Sports venues in Cyprus
Sports venues completed in 2016
Sport in Larnaca
Buildings and structures in Larnaca